Geant may refer to:
 Giant puppet festivals:
 Géant du Nord, Nord-Pas-de-Calais, France
 Philippines: Higantes Festival
 Venlo: 
 Géant Casino, a European hypermarket chain based in France
 GÉANT, a European computer network for research and education
 Dent du Géant, a mountain in the Alps
 GEANT, acronym for GEometry ANd Tracking, a series of software toolkit platforms developed by CERN
 GEANT-3
 Geant4
 Hipermercado Géant, Uruguay's largest supermarket
 Géant Ferré, French language name of André the Giant

See also
 Les géants (disambiguation), film and novel